Saol ("Life") – full title Saol na Gaeilge – is an Irish-language monthly newspaper supported by Foras na Gaeilge, the public body responsible for the promotion of the language throughout the island of Ireland. Printed on the presses of the Connacht Tribune in Galway, the newspaper has its headquarters in Dublin.

See also
List of Celtic-language media

External links
 Saol.gaeilge.ie website (archived 2015)

Irish-language newspapers
Monthly newspapers
Newspapers published in Ireland
Publications with year of establishment missing